Phalonidia ochraceana is a species of moth of the family Tortricidae. It is found in Argentina.

References

Moths described in 1967
Phalonidia